The Seagulls of Kristiansund is a live album by jazz pianist Mal Waldron recorded at the Village Vanguard and released on the Italian Soul Note label in 1987.

Reception
The Allmusic review awarded the album 4½ stars.

Track listing
All compositions by Mal Waldron
 "Snake Out" — 17:19 
 "Judy" — 12:42 
 "The Seagulls of Kristiansund" — 26:02 
Recorded at the Village Vanguard in New York City on September 16, 1986

Personnel
Mal Waldron — piano
Woody Shaw — trumpet
Charlie Rouse — tenor saxophone, flute
Reggie Workman — bass
Ed Blackwell — drums

References

1987 live albums
Mal Waldron albums
Black Saint/Soul Note albums
Albums recorded at the Village Vanguard